In mathematics, the Riemann–Stieltjes integral is a generalization of the Riemann integral, named after Bernhard Riemann and Thomas Joannes Stieltjes. The definition of this integral was first published in 1894 by Stieltjes. It serves as an instructive and useful precursor of the Lebesgue integral, and an invaluable tool in unifying equivalent forms of statistical theorems that apply to discrete and continuous probability.

Formal definition
The Riemann–Stieltjes integral of a real-valued function  of a real variable on the interval  with respect to another real-to-real function  is denoted by

Its definition uses a sequence of partitions  of the interval 

The integral, then, is defined to be the limit, as the mesh (the length of the longest subinterval) of the partitions approaches , of the approximating sum

where  is in the -th subinterval . Typically  is taken to be monotone (or at least of bounded variation) and right-semicontinuous (however this last is essentially convention). We specifically do not require  to be continuous, which allows for integrals that have point mass terms.

The "limit" is here understood to be a number A (the value of the Riemann–Stieltjes integral) such that for every ε > 0, there exists δ > 0 such that for every partition P with norm(P) < δ, and for every choice of points ci in [xi, xi+1],

Properties
The Riemann–Stieltjes integral admits integration by parts in the form

and the existence of either integral implies the existence of the other.

On the other hand, a classical result shows that the integral is well-defined if f is α-Hölder continuous and g is β-Hölder continuous with  .

For a step function
	

Application to probability theory

If g is the cumulative probability distribution function of a random variable X that has a probability density function with respect to Lebesgue measure, and f is any function for which the expected value  is finite, then the probability density function of X is the derivative of g and we have

But this formula does not work if X does not have a probability density function with respect to Lebesgue measure.  In particular, it does not work if the distribution of X is discrete (i.e., all of the probability is accounted for by point-masses), and even if the cumulative distribution function g is continuous, it does not work if g fails to be absolutely continuous (again, the Cantor function may serve as an example of this failure).  But the identity

holds if g is any cumulative probability distribution function on the real line, no matter how ill-behaved.  In particular, no matter how ill-behaved the cumulative distribution function g of a random variable X, if the moment E(Xn) exists, then it is equal to

Application to functional analysis
The Riemann–Stieltjes integral appears in the original formulation of F. Riesz's theorem which represents  the dual space of the Banach space  C[a,b] of continuous functions in an interval [a,b] as Riemann–Stieltjes integrals against functions of bounded variation.  Later, that theorem was reformulated in terms of measures.

The Riemann–Stieltjes integral also appears in the formulation of the spectral theorem for (non-compact) self-adjoint (or more generally, normal) operators in a Hilbert space.  In this theorem, the integral is considered with respect to a spectral family of projections.

Existence of the integral
The best simple existence theorem states that if f is continuous and g is of bounded variation on [a, b], then the integral exists. A function g is of bounded variation if and only if it is the difference between two (bounded) monotone functions.  If g is not of bounded variation, then there will be continuous functions which cannot be integrated with respect to g.  In general, the integral is not well-defined if f and g share any points of discontinuity, but there are other cases as well.

Geometric interpretation
If the - plane is horizontal and the -direction is pointing upward, then the surface to be considered is like a curved fence. The fence is the section of the -sheet (i.e., the  curve extended along the  axis) that is bounded between the - plane and the -sheet. The Riemann-Stieljes integral is the area of the projection of this fence onto the - plane — in effect, its "shadow".

The slope of  weights the area of the projection.

When  is a step function

Generalization
An important generalization is the Lebesgue–Stieltjes integral, which generalizes the Riemann–Stieltjes integral in a way analogous to how the Lebesgue integral generalizes the Riemann integral. If improper Riemann–Stieltjes integrals are allowed, then the Lebesgue integral is not strictly more general than the Riemann–Stieltjes integral.

The Riemann–Stieltjes integral also generalizes to the case when either the integrand ƒ or the integrator g take values in a Banach space.  If  takes values in the Banach space X, then it is natural to assume that it is of strongly bounded variation, meaning that

the supremum being taken over all finite partitions

of the interval [a,b].  This generalization plays a role in the study of semigroups, via the Laplace–Stieltjes transform.

The Itô integral extends the Riemann–Stietjes integral to encompass integrands and integrators which are stochastic processes rather than simple functions; see also stochastic calculus.

Generalized Riemann–Stieltjes integral
A slight generalization is to consider in the above definition partitions P that refine another partition Pε, meaning that P arises from Pε by the addition of points, rather than from partitions with a finer mesh. Specifically, the generalized Riemann–Stieltjes integral of f with respect to g is a number A such that for every ε > 0 there exists a partition Pε such that for every partition P that refines Pε,

for every choice of points ci in [xi, xi+1].

This generalization exhibits the Riemann–Stieltjes integral as the Moore–Smith limit on the directed set of partitions of [a, b] .

A consequence is that with this definition, the integral  can still be defined in cases where f and g have a point of discontinuity in common.

Darboux sums
The Riemann–Stieltjes integral can be efficiently handled using an appropriate generalization of Darboux sums.  For a partition P and a nondecreasing function g on [a, b] define the upper Darboux sum of f with respect to g by

and the lower sum by

Then the generalized Riemann–Stieltjes of f with respect to g exists if and only if, for every ε > 0, there exists a partition P such that

Furthermore, f is Riemann–Stieltjes integrable with respect to g (in the classical sense) if

Examples and special cases

Differentiable g(x) 

where the integral on the right-hand side is the standard Riemann integral, assuming that  can be integrated by the Riemann–Stieltjes integral.

More generally, the Riemann integral equals the Riemann–Stieltjes integral if  is the Lebesgue integral of its derivative; in this case  is said to be absolutely continuous.

It may be the case that  has jump discontinuities, or may have derivative zero almost everywhere while still being continuous and increasing (for example,  could be the Cantor function or “Devil's staircase”), in either of which cases the Riemann–Stieltjes integral is not captured by any expression involving derivatives of g.

Riemann integral 
The standard Riemann integral is a special case of the Riemann–Stieltjes integral where .

Rectifier 
Consider the function  used in the study of neural networks, called a rectified linear unit (ReLU). Then the Riemann–Stieltjes can be evaluated as

where the integral on the right-hand side is the standard Riemann integral.

Cavalieri integration
 
Cavalieri's principle can be used to calculate areas bounded by curves using Riemann–Stieltjes integrals. The integration strips of Riemann integration are replaced with strips that are non-rectangular in shape. The method is to transform a "Cavaliere region" with a transformation , or to use  as integrand.

For a given function  on an interval , a "translational function"  must intersect  exactly once for any shift in the interval. The area of the region is then

Notes

References

 via HathiTrust

 
 
 
 
 
 
 
 
 
 

Definitions of mathematical integration
Bernhard Riemann